Bak Mei is said to have been one of the legendary Five Elders — survivors of the destruction of the Shaolin Monastery by the Qing dynasty (1644–1912) — who, according to some accounts, betrayed Shaolin to the imperial government. He shares his name with the South Chinese martial art attributed to him.

Bak Mei has been fictionalized in Hong Kong martial arts films such as Executioners from Shaolin (1977), Abbot of Shaolin (1979), and Clan of the White Lotus (1980). Bak Mei as a fictional character is better known in the West as Pai Mei, played by Gordon Liu in the Hollywood action film Kill Bill, Vol. 2 (2004).
Bak Mei Style Kung Fu is used as inspiration fighting style for the video game Sifu (2022).

Background
Accounts of the Five Elders are many and varied, with some versions identifying the traitor as Bak Mei and others as Ma Ning-Yee. In other versions, both elders betray Shaolin,  sometimes along with Fung Do-Duk. Still others say that “Bak Mei” was actually a nickname for either Ma Ning-Yee or Fung Do-Duk.

The degree to which stories of the Five Elders are based on historical fact remains unverified. Their ubiquity and widespread popularity can be at least partially attributed to Wuxia novels (such as Wan Nian Qing), as well as the mythology around anti-Qing organizations such as the Heaven and Earth Society, which were spreading rapidly through China in the early 19th century. Whether justified or not, Bak Mei's traitorous reputation led to animosity between practitioners of his namesake martial art and practitioners of martial arts identified with those whom he is accused of betraying.

In the accounts of some Bak Mei practitioners, their founder did not so much betray Shaolin as decline to join their rebellion against the Qing. Other accounts portray Bak Mei as having been banished from Shaolin Temple because he killed several of his fellow monks when he first began practicing his new fighting style. Some Bak Mei practitioners have interpreted this to prove that their founder's style was superior to that of the Shaolin disciples he allegedly killed.

Historical Bak Mei

According to legend, Bak Mei played an important part in the downfall of Shaolin temples. Manchu conquered China in 1644. Before then, China had been ruled by the Ming Dynasty, which had been weakened by internal corruption and rebellion. The Manchu dynasty became known as the Qing Dynasty. As part of the Manchu campaign to pacify China, they attacked some Buddhist Shaolin Temples. The leader of the Shaolin Temple, Hong Mei (“Red Eyebrows”) died, leaving his legacy to Chi Thien Su, also known as Jee Sin, one of the five Great Kung Fu Masters. According to some stories another such master, Chu Long Tuyen, the monk who would later become Bak Mei, did not accept this. He believed the Ming had become corrupt and Chi Thien Su would still serve them; Bak Mei would rather serve the foreign Qing Dynasty. Then came the attack against the Shaolin Temple at Quanzhou in Fujian province in 1647. Some sources indicate that this temple was actually in Henan, or that the invading forces recruited help from Tibetan warriors in the attack.
The Five Elders survived, however, and soon Chi Thien Su would found a second Shaolin Temple at Nine Lotus Mountain, also in Fujian Province. The Five Kung Fu Masters survived the first destruction of the Shaolin Temple by Qing Imperial forces and sought shelter in another temple, Fujian Temple, but the other monks were massacred. After Bak Mei refused to provide his real name for fear of retribution (against his family and students - if they survived), the Abbott of the temple christened the monk “Bak Mei” - White Eyebrow. According to some stories, Bak Mei betrayed the Ming at this point, taking information about their plot against the Manchu to the Manchu Shunzhi Emperor, then returned with information about the Manchu attack plan to the Shaolin. After the temple was destroyed by the Manchu, Bak Mei left the temple to study Taoism. Bak Mei trained an anti-Imperial attack force but following capture of the force by the Imperials, was forced to teach and lead 50,000 Imperial troops in the second destruction of the Shaolin Temple at Henan to prevent those captured with him from being tortured and killed. There, Bak Mei slew the “invincible” Shaolin leader, Chi Thien Su, in single combat by breaking his neck. He claimed he did this to prevent the massacre of the monks in the temple by the troops who followed him.
The tale of Bak Mei's death comes in many forms - it is often claimed that he was poisoned, or slain (in a grand battle) by other martial artists. Bak Mei is often portrayed as a traitor, however, it is important to note that Bak Mei's actions are not always consistent with this. Bak Mei's actions were undertaken, even to the destruction of the temple, with the intention of preventing harm to those who had chosen to follow him. It is possible that if Bak Mei had not aided the Imperial forces, his followers would have been tortured to death.

Historical Bak Mei according to the lineage of master Jie Kon Sieuw

During the reign of the Kangxi Emperor (r. 1661–1722) in the Qing dynasty, the warriors of the Xilufan revolt were so feared that the two ministers the Kangxi Emperor ordered to end their attacks fled China rather than face either the mercilessness of the Xilu warriors or the displeasure of the emperor, both of which often involved beheading.

It was the 128 monks of the southern Shaolin temple who defeated the army of Xilu over three months in 1673 without suffering a single casualty. However, by doing so the monks had made enemies of those in the Qing army and Qing court who were embarrassed by how easily the Shaolin monks had succeeded where they had failed. Soon rumors began to spread about the threat posed by a power so great that it defeated the entire Xilu army with a force of only 128 monks. This campaign of innuendo was wasted on the Kangxi Emperor, who remained grateful to the monks, but the rumors had their intended effect on his successor, the Yongzheng Emperor (r. 1722–1735), who ordered the temple's destruction.

In 1723, on the sixth day of the first new moon of the lunar calendar, Qing forces launched a sneak attack on the southern Shaolin temple, which began by bombarding the largely wooden monastery with a relentless deluge of burning arrows. Between the surprise attack, the fire, and the overwhelming number of Qing soldiers, 110 out of the 128 monks were killed that day. The Great Shaolin Purge took 70 days as Qing forces hunted down the 18 survivors. The surviving warrior monks of Shaolin inflicted massive casualties on their Qing pursuers but, in the end, their numbers were too great. Soon only five remained:
 The Chan master Jee Sin
 The nun Ng Mui
 The Taoist Bak Mei
 The Taoist Fung Dou Dak
 The "unshaved" (lay) Shaolin student Miu Hin

After two years of running and hiding from the Qing army, these fugitives of the cloth regrouped at Mount Emei in Sichuan Province. As one of the sacred mountains of China, Mount Emei was home to about 70 monasteries and temples where the five clerics could blend in easily.

It was decided that Bak Mei would infiltrate the Qing imperial court as a spy while the others travelled throughout China to establish an alliance of anti-Qing rebels. However, the more Bak Mei learned, the more he realized that his allies’ efforts would never be enough to overthrow the Qing, and so he left the rebellion, who took this as a betrayal, forcing Bak Mei on the run from those he was once on the run with. Almost all of the rebels who over the years sought to murder Bak Mei for his withdrawal from the struggle ended up dead at Bak Mei's hands, including Jee Sin and Miu Hin's son, Fong Sai-yuk, whom Bak Mei had known since Fong was a small boy. In other accounts, Fong Sai-yuk is not Miu Hin's son but his grandson.

Comments

Both these versions of the legend of Pai Mei come from inheritors of Bak Mei Kung Fu yet are very different from each other. Accounts of the Bak Mei and the Five Great Kung Fu Masters are many and varied.
The latter account names the Shaolin traitor as Ma Ning-Yee rather than Bak Mei, though that detail was omitted for reasons of length. In other versions, Bak Mei and Ma Ning-Yee both betray Shaolin, sometimes joined by Fung Do-Duk. Still other versions say that “Bak Mei” is a nickname for either Ma Ning-Yee or Fung Do-Duk. For that matter, the legend of Bak Mei may have no basis in historical fact at all, and come solely from wuxia novels like Wan Nian Qing. The legends are particularly confused because some temples were burned down repeatedly, including after the time of Bak Mei.

Bak Mei Kung Fu

Bak Mei is characterized by its emphasis on powerful close range hand strikes. Within Bak Mei can be found the four principles of Fou (Float), Chum (Sink), Tun (Swallow), and Tou (Spit) common in the Southern Chinese martial arts like Ng Ying Kungfu, and also found in Karate. Unique to Bak Mei is its classification of the following 6 powers: biu (thrusting), chum (sinking), tan (springing), fa (neutralizing), tung, and chuk. Bak Mei emphasizes the movements of the tiger. The traditions of Bak Mei Kung Fu trace its origins to Mount Emei, where Bak Mei is said to have transmitted the art to the Chan (Zen) master Gwong Wai, who transmitted the art to the Chan master Juk Faat Wan and the Taoist Fung Fo.

Futshan branch

The Taoist Fung Fo in turn passed the art on to Lau Siu-Leung, who established the Futshan lineage of Bak Mei.

Cheung Lai-Chuen branch

Cheung Lai-Chuen began his study of the martial arts at the age of 7 with the traditional Chinese medicine practitioner Shak Lim, who taught him the Vagrant style. Later, Cheung would learn from Li Mung, who taught Chueng his family style, and from the Lam Yiu-Kwai's older uncle. While he was studying martial arts with the Lam family, he became close friends with their son Lam Yiu-Kwai, with whom he had much in common. Lam would later become known for disseminating Dragon Kung Fu much as Cheung would later become known for disseminating Bak Mei. Both were born in Hu¨¬y¨¢ng (»Ýê–) County in the prefecture of Huizhou in Guangdong and a marriage between their families would eventually make them cousins. They both left Huizhou to build their futures in Guangzhou and did so by opening several schools together.
After moving to Guangzhou, Cheung was defeated by the monk Lin Sang after which the monk referred Cheung to his own teacher master Juk Faat Wan, who taught Cheung the art of Bak Mei over the next two or three years.
Cheung had a background in Hakka Kuen, the martial arts of the Hakka people, from his study of the family style of Li Mung and the Vagrant style, which are both identified with the Hakka, as is Southern Praying Mantis (which Cheung is not known to have trained in). Because of this, Cheung's style of Bak Mei is associated with Hakka Kuen, but more strongly still with the Dragon style of Lam Yiu-Kwai¡ªwho is also said to have had a background in Hakka Kuen¡ªdue to the many years Cheung and Lam spent training together.

Historical origins of Bai Mei
In 2012 an academic research was done on the historical origins of the style of Baimei Quan (Pak Mei Kuen or White Eyebrow Fist) and the validity of the monk Bai Mei, using the resources of US University Professors of Chinese and Buddhist Studies as well as Mr. Xiong Feng of the Emei Shan Museum, Sichuan, China.

The earliest reference to the monk Bai Mei as an actual person comes in the Wuxia novel called Wunnian Qing (A Thousand Years Green or Evergreen) as being one of the five ancestors who survived the sacking of the Shaolin Temple (circa 1727) by the Qing army.  Yet there are many problems with this source, as follows;
 It is a work of fiction (anonymous) and has no historical basis whatsoever.
 There is no historical evidence to suggest that the Shaolin Temple of Henan Province was ever attacked and destroyed by the Qing armies but this is not unexpected considering the destruction of many martial texts in Shaolin history.

Guanghui means Vast Benevolence and is a typical Buddhist nomination for either a monk or a temple; indeed there are several temples throughout China that bear this name. Yet on searching through the surviving gazetteers for Mount Emei there is no mention of a monk named Guanghui. There is no material evidence to suggest that Guanghui came from Emei Shan; all we have is the oral tradition from Zhang Liquan (Cheung Lai Chuen) that his Shifu, Zhu Fayun, came from a temple in Sichuan Province.

Zhu Fayun. Fa, in the context of a monk's name, means Buddhist Teachings and Yun means Cloud. The Chinese character Zhu formed part of the ancient word Tianzhu, meaning India.
Zhu Fayun is said to have been a Buddhist monk from Emei Shan in Sichuan Province on a pilgrimage to the Guangxiao (Bright Filial Monastery), in Guangzhou. This is entirely plausible as the Guangxiao monastery is one of the oldest temples in south China as well as being one of the most influential Buddhist shrines. During his stay in Guangxiao, Zhu Fayun committed to teach Zhang Liquan (Cheung Lai Chuen) the Baimei arts.

Zhang Liquan (1882-1964). It would seem that Zhang Liquan was essentially an honest man with respect to his martial arts. He learnt three different styles from three different masters prior to having met Zhu Fayun. He formally acknowledges each of his former Shifu by name and honors them by keeping at least one of their forms in the Pak Mei syllabus.  At a later stage in his career, Zhang Liquan formulated several of his own forms, including Tuotiao Quan (Cantonese: Tit Til Kuen) and Simen Bagua (Cantonese: Say Mun Ba Gua) which he openly professed were his own works.  It would appear contradictory to suggest that such a man, who has been totally honest about the origins of all that he has learnt, would deny the existence of one teacher, or indeed invent a fictional character to disguise his own works when he has already affirmed creating several of his own.

All the supplementary forms in the Pak Mei syllabus, whatever the original style, fall under the collective classification of Nan Quan (Southern Fist) or more precisely Dong Jiang Quan (East River Fist). A common denominator to all these forms is that they are divided into two parts; the second being a repetition of the first, performed in the opposite direction. They also have numerous stances and techniques in common and share similar terminology and methodology.

Bak Mei according to the lineage of Nam Anh
Ming China, which had been weakened by corruption and internal rebellion, was overtaken by the Manchu people in 1644.  Hong Mei ("Red Eyebrows"), abbot of the Southern Shaolin Temple, died during this time and his position was passed onto Chi Thien Su, known by his Dharma name Jee Sin Sim See, "Chan teacher Perfection".  Another master named Chu Long Tuyen did not accept this. He believed the Ming had become corrupt and would rather serve the Manchu Qing dynasty.

In 1647 Manchu forces attacked the Southern Shaolin Temple in Quanzhou, Fujian. Only five masters managed to escape, and since then became known as the Five Elders.

Chi Thien Su, one of the Five Elders, founded another temple at Nine Lotus Mountain in Fujian where the survivors sought shelter. Chu Long Tuyen refused to provide his real name for fear of retribution against his family and students, in case they survived. The abbot then christened him Bak Mei "White Eyebrows". According to some stories, Bak Mei betrayed the Ming by taking information about their plot against the invaders to the Shunzhi Emperor, then returned with information about the Manchu attack plan to the Shaolin. After the temple was destroyed, Bak Mei and Fong Toh Tak (creator of the Bak Fu Pai) left the temple on separate paths in order to study Taoism.

Bak Mei trained an anti-imperial attack force but, following capture of the force by the imperials, was forced to teach and lead 50,000 imperial troops in the second destruction of the Shaolin Temple to prevent those captured with him from being tortured and killed. There, Bak Mei slew the "invincible" Shaolin leader Jee Sin in single combat by breaking his neck. He claimed he did this to prevent the massacre of the monks in the temple by the troops who followed him.

While he is often portrayed as a traitor, Bak Mei's actions were undertaken, including the destruction of the temple, with the intention of preventing harm to those who had chosen to follow him. It is possible that if Bak Mei had not aided the imperial forces, his followers would have been tortured to death.

Bak Mei according to the lineage of Jie Kon Siew 
During the reign of the Kangxi Emperor (1662–1722), the warriors of the Xilufan rebellion were so feared that the two ministers whom Kangxi ordered to quell the revolt fled China rather than face the mercilessness of the Xilu warriors, which often involved beheading. In 1673, over a period of three months, the 128 monks of the southern Shaolin Temple defeated the Xilu army without suffering a single casualty. However, by doing so they had made enemies of some Qing officers who were embarrassed by how easily the Shaolin monks had succeeded where they had failed.

Rumors soon began to spread about the threat posed by a power so great that it defeated the entire Xilu army with a force of only 128 monks. This campaign of innuendo was wasted on the Kangxi Emperor, who remained grateful to the monks, but the rumors had their intended effect on his successor, the Yongzheng Emperor (1722–1735). He began his reign by plotting the temple's destruction and was said to have secretly recruited a band of renegade warrior monks from Tibet to carry out his plan.

In 1723, on the 6th day of the first new moon of the lunar calendar, a former Shaolin disciple named Ma Ning-Yee aided Qing forces to launch a sneak attack on the southern Shaolin Temple. They began the assault by bombarding the largely wooden monastery with a relentless deluge of burning arrows. Between the surprise attack, the fire, and the overwhelming number of Qing soldiers, 110 out of the 128 monks were killed that day. The Great Shaolin Purge took 70 days as Qing forces hunted down the 18 survivors. The surviving monks of Shaolin inflicted massive casualties on their Qing pursuers but, in the end, their numbers were too great.

Soon only five remained. Their identities vary but they are generally accepted as the following:
 The Chan Monk Jee Sin
 The Shaolin Abbess Ng Mui Si Tai
 The Chan Monk Bak Mei
 The Daoist Fung Do-Duk who later created the white tiger style
 The "unshaved" (lay) disciple Miu Hin

After two years of running and hiding from the Qing army, these fugitives of the cloth regrouped at Mount Emei in Sichuan Province.
As one of the sacred mountains of China, Mount Emei was home to about 70 monasteries and temples where the five clerics could blend in easily.

It was decided that Bak Mei would infiltrate the Qing court as a spy while the others travelled throughout China to establish an alliance of anti-Qing rebels. The more Bak Mei learned, the more he realized that his allies' efforts would never be enough to overthrow the Qing. He decided to give up on the rebellion, which was seen as a betrayal.

Death 
Bak Mei was eventually killed but accounts disagree on whether he was poisoned or slain. Over the years, the rebels sought to punish Bak Mei for his defection. Almost all who made an attempt on his life ended up dead at Bak Mei's hands. This included Jee Sin and Miu Hin's son Fong Sai Yuk (Miu Hin's grandson according to other sources) whom Bak Mei had known since Sai Yuk was a small boy. Some say he was finally killed by the combined effort of Hoong Man Ting and Wu Ah Phiew who employed the Crane Style and the Tiger Style to avenge the burning of the Shaolin Temple and the death of their sigung (teacher's teacher), the Venerable Jee Sin, the Abbott whom Pak Mei is said to have killed in a duel during the burning of the temple.

Bak Mei Pai
The Bak Mei Pai traces its origins to Mount Emei, where Bak Mei is said to have transmitted the art to the Chan (Zen) master Gwong Wai who then passed it on to Juk Faat Wan.

Bak Mei's fighting style makes use of the four principles of "floating" (fou), "sinking" (chum), "swallowing" (tun) and "spitting" (tou) common in the southern Chinese martial arts. It is characterized by its emphasis on powerful close range hand strikes. Bak Mei strikes are usually executed in conjunction with intercepting and jamming the opponent's strike. Unique to Bak Mei, is its classification of the following 6 neijin (powers): biu (thrusting), chum (sinking), tan (springing), fa (neutralizing), tung, and chuk. Bak-Mei can produce effects on the nervous system that benefit the practitioner if taught correctly.  Bak-Mei emphasizes the techniques of Leopard Kung Fu and its strikes are executed with fluidity and power via Fa jin. Additionally, it contains numerous Dim-Mak applications.  These applications are comparable with anatomy focused arts such as tuite and chin-nah.  Some of these applications involve throwing, takedowns, and restraining techniques.

Fushan branch 
According to the Fatsan family tree, Pak Mei passed the art to Kwong Wai, Chuk Yun, Fung Fo Dao Yan, Lau Siu-Leung who established the Fatsan lineage of Bak Mei. (source: Barbary Jonathan)

Jeung Lai Chuen branch 

Jeung Lai Chuen began his study of the martial arts at the age of 7 with the Classical Chinese Medicine practitioner Sek Lam, who taught him the vagrant style.  Jeung would later learn Li Style from Li Mung, (founded by Li Yi李義) who taught Jeung his family style. While he was studying martial arts with the Lam family, he became close friends with their son Lam Yiu Gwai, with whom he had much in common, and eventually studied under Yiu Gwai's uncle. Lam would later become known for disseminating Dragon Kung Fu much as Jeung would later become known for disseminating Bak Mei. Both were born in Huìyáng County in the Huizhou prefecture of Guangdong and a marriage between their families would eventually make them cousins.
They both left Huizhou to build their futures in Guangzhou and did so by opening several schools together.

After moving to Guangzhou, Jeung was defeated by the monk Lin Sang after which the monk referred Jeung to his own teacher Juk Faat Wan, who taught Jeung the art of Bak Mei over the next two or three years. Jeung had a background in the martial arts of the Hakka people, from his study of Li Mung's family style and the vagrant style. Because of this, Jeung's style of Bak Mei is associated  the dragon style of Lam Yiu Gwai due to the many years Jeung and Lam spent training together.

Bak Mei Forms:  This is an example of a form curriculum.
直步標指 - Jik Bou Biu Ji
十字拳 - Sup Ji Kuen (also called Sek Si)
石獅拳 - Sek Si Kuen (also called Sup Ji)
三門八卦 - Saam Mun Baat Gwa Kuen
四門八卦 - Sei Mun Baat Gwa Kuen
九步推 - Gau Bou Tui
鷹爪黏橋 - Ying Jow Lim Kiu
金剛拳 - Gam Gong Kuen (created by 5th gen Chan Gwok Wah)
地煞拳 - Dei Saat Kuen
十八摩橋 - Sap Baat Moh Kiu
猛虎出林 - Maang Fu Chut Lam
五行摩 - Ng Hang Moh

Early disciples 
Cheung Lai Chuen's first set of six disciples in Guangzhou were: 

(Chinese)    (Cantonese)        (Mandarin)
邱人和        Yau Yan Wo /       Qiu Renhe 
劉鑫容        Lau Yam Yung /    Liu Xinrong
朱百貴       Jyu/Chu Bak Gwai / Zhu Baigui
葉竹林          Yip Juk Lam /    Ye Zhulin
王耀光        Wong Yiu Gwong / Wang Yaoguang
李達橋           Lei Dat Kiu / Li Daqiao

Notes

References

External links

Pak Mei Reference books(Wayback Machine copy)

Bak
Martial arts of Hakka origins
Qing dynasty Buddhist monks
17th-century Buddhist monks
Chinese duellists